Valençay is a commune in the Indre department in the administrative region of Centre-Val de Loire, France.

Geography
Valençay is situated in the Loire Valley. It sits at the end of a plateau. on a hillside overlooking the River Nahon. Valençay is part of Berry.

History
The commune was formed by the union of three settlements: the "Bourg-de-l'Eglise", the "Bas-Bourg" and what is called the "old quarter."

The chateau is a part of the Loire Valley by virtue of the date of its construction and its dimensions, which give it a similar appearance to Chambord. 

A 12th century castle existed on this site, was demolished and construction of its replacement began in 1520, albeit slowly. The chateau was born in the 16th and 17th centuries by the Estampes family. Louis of Estampes, governor and baillif of Blois, undertook the building of the large round tower at the end of the entrance wing. He died in 1530, leaving the tower unfinished. The tower rises above the entry. 

Work on Valençay began again about 1540 under Jacques of Estampes, lord of the manor. He had married a Grassement with a financier in the family. The lord wanted a residence worthy of his new fortune. Jacques covered the dome of the tower with an imperial design. 

Valençay was rebuilt multiple times. 

At the end of the 16th century, Jean of Estampes built a gatehouse in the shape of a keep, confined to four turrets. It connects to the spans built by Jacques. Jean built the building and the tower on the left of the central house. In the 17th century, Dominique of Estampes finished the wing in the same style as the first half. The castle then formed a quadrilateral enclosed by a second wing and, at the bottom of the court, by arcades.

Finance remained mixed with Valençay's history: among its successive owners include farmers. Valençay was sold in 1747 to the general farmer Legendre de Villemorien. He demolished a part of the buildings, preserving only the entry and the first wing. Also Scottish banker John Law purchased it.

In 1803 the castle was purchased by diplomat Charles Maurice de Talleyrand..

On 6 May 1941, Georges Bégué, the first SOE agent from England, was parachuted into a field near Valençay. Fifty years later, the Valençay SOE Memorial, originally known as the "Spirit of Partnership," was dedicated in honour of the 104 members of SOE's F Section who died for the liberation of France.

Design of the chateau 
The entrance is asymmetric and features an enormous tower and a house. The wing offers a more homogeneous style but this unity is superficial and of later vintage.

Population

Economy
The town is known for its pyramid-shaped Valençay cheese made from raw goats' milk.

See also
Berry
Saint-Benoît-du-Sault
French wine
Communes of the Indre department
Pearl Witherington, Resistance leader during World War II

References

External links

 Official website of Valençay
 Official website of Valençay's Castle
 www.vins-fromages-valencay.com -  Valençay wines and cheeses

Communes of Indre
Berry, France